Staphylococcus simiae is a Gram-positive, coagulase-negative member of the bacterial genus Staphylococcus consisting of clustered cocci.  This species was originally isolated from the gastrointestinal tract of South American squirrel monkeys, Saimiri sciureus, and found to be genetically similar to S. aureus, but more biochemically similar to S. piscifermentans.
A draft genome of S. simiae  was sequenced.

References

External links
Type strain of Staphylococcus simiae at BacDive -  the Bacterial Diversity Metadatabase

simiae
Bacteria described in 2005